William J. Marrott (born c. 1900) was a rugby union player who represented Australia.

Marrott, a number eight, claimed a total of 7 international rugby caps for Australia. His brother Robert was also an Australian rugby union representative player

References

Australian rugby union players
Australia international rugby union players
Rugby union number eights